Salar may refer to:

Places
Salar, Spain, a municipality in Granada
Salar, Murshidabad, a census town in West Bengal, India
Salar railway station
Salar, Afyonkarahisar, a town in Afyonkarahisar District, Turkey
Salar, Uzbekistan, a town in Tashkent District
Kampong Salar, a village in Mukim Mentiri, Brunei-Muara District, Brunei

People
Salar people, an ethnic group in China
Salar language, the language of the Salar People
Salar (name), a Persian first name given to boys
Sayf al-Din Salar (c. 1260s–1310), viceroy of the Mamluk sultan al-Nasir Muhammad

See also

Salares, a town and municipality in Málaga, Andalusia, Spain